The 2012 The Dominion Curling Club Championship was held from November 19 to 24 at the Scarboro Golf and Country Club in Scarborough, Ontario. In the men's final, Dan Sherrard of Alberta defeated Steve Irwin of Manitoba with a score of 7–6, stealing the winning point in the eight end. In the women's final, Caroline Deans of Ontario defeated Sonia Simard of Quebec with a score of 8–3.

Men

Teams
The teams are listed as follows:

Round-robin standings
Final round-robin standings

Round-robin results
All draw times listed in Eastern Standard Time.

Draw 1
Monday, November 19, 4:45 pm

 and  receive byes this round.

Draw 3
Tuesday, November 20, 9:30 am

 and  receive byes this round.

Draw 5
Tuesday, November 20, 4:45 pm

 and  receive byes this round.

Draw 8
Wednesday, November 21, 1:15 pm

 and  receive byes this round.

Draw 10
Wednesday, November 21, 8:15 pm

 and  receive byes this round.

Draw 11
Thursday, November 22, 9:30 am

 and  receive byes this round.

Draw 13
Thursday, November 22, 4:45 pm

 and  receive byes this round.

Tiebreakers
Friday, November 23, 9:30 am

Friday, November 23, 1:15 pm

Playoffs

Semifinal
Friday, November 23, 7:00 pm

Final
Saturday, November 24, 2:00 pm

Women

Teams
The teams are listed as follows:

Round-robin standings
Final round-robin standings

Round-robin results
All draw times listed in Eastern Standard Time.

Draw 2
Monday, November 19, 8:15 pm

 and  receive byes this round.

Draw 4
Tuesday, November 20, 1:15 pm

 and  receive byes this round.

Draw 6
Tuesday, November 20, 8:15 pm

 and  receive byes this round.

Draw 7
Wednesday, November 21, 9:30 am

 and  receive byes this round.

Draw 9
Wednesday, November 21, 4:45 pm

 and  receive byes this round.

Draw 12
Thursday, November 22, 1:15 pm

 and  receive byes this round.

Draw 14
Thursday, November 22, 8:15 pm

 and  receive byes this round.

Playoffs

Semifinal
Friday, November 23, 7:00 pm

Final
Saturday, November 24, 10:45 am

References

External links

The Dominion Curling Club Championships, 2012
Curling in Toronto
Scarborough, Toronto
2012 in Ontario
Canadian Curling Club Championships
November 2012 sports events in Canada